The King Abdullah City for Atomic and Renewable Energy (K.A.CARE) is an scientific, research and governmental entity in the Kingdom of Saudi Arabia that is legally independent chaired by the Minister of Energy, which deals with the issues of nuclear and renewable energy in Saudi Arabia and contributes to the sustainable development of the energy sector in the Kingdom and founded in 2010 headquartered in Riyadh city.

K.A.CARE conducts applied research to serve sustainable development and provide recommendations regarding renewable energy and atomic energy on the national scale. It plays a key role in planning the introduction of peaceful nuclear energy technologies in Saudi Arabia, including participation in the preparation of the national strategy to establish a balanced and sustainable national energy mix, and to develop the necessary plans for its implementation as well as programs support, research and scientific partnerships in this context. K.A. CARE also works to develop the necessary human capacities in the nuclear and renewable energy sectors and to localize the industrial products resulting from these sectors. K.A.CARE seeks to coordinate with its partners from government agencies, scientific institutions and applied research centers to exchange information and experiences, as well as to establish partnerships through scientific cooperation between the Kingdom and international scientific institutions.

Leadership 
H.R.H. Abdulaziz bin Salman – President (2022 – present)
H.E Dr. Khalid ben Saleh Al-Sultan – President (2018 – 2022)
H.E Dr. Hashim ben Abdullah Yamani - President (2010 – 2018)
H.E Dr. Walid ben Hussain Abu Alfaraj - Vice President (2010 – 2018)
H.E Dr. Khalid ben Mohammed Al Sulaiman – Vice President for Renewable Energy (2010 2014)

Mission 
K.A.CARE works on proposing a national policy for nuclear and renewable energy and implementing the necessary strategic plan, as well as establishing and managing projects to achieve its independent objectives with the relevant parties inside and outside the kingdom, and establishing projects to generate electricity using nuclear and renewable energy sources to achieve a sustainable national energy mix, and launching research and development centers to contribute to sustainable development enhance the national economy.

K.A.CARE also specializes in the achieving the following:

 Proposing the national policy for the development of an efficient and balanced national energy sector that contributes to the development of the local economy as well as the development of the strategies and plans necessary for its implementation.
 Qualification of national work force 
 Provide renewable energy data to the private sector in order to select the areas with the best solar radiation for the establishment of renewable energy projects in the Kingdom.
 Supports joint research programs between the Kingdom and the international scientific institutions to keep abreast of the continuous scientific development in nuclear and renewable energy technologies.
 Conduct feasibility studies for nuclear reactors for peaceful uses.
 Raise awareness of the importance of atomic and renewable energy for the future of the national economy
 Partnership and cooperation with the largest international suppliers of nuclear technology to familiarize them with the objectives of the components of the “Saudi National Atomic Energy Project” in the Kingdom, especially in the field of large nuclear reactors, and the Kingdom's aim to enter into the peaceful use of nuclear energy to produce electricity and desalinated water.

Projects and Initiatives 

 Saudi National Atomic Energy Project (SNEAP):

The National Atomic Energy Project was established in 2017 and consists of four main components:

1. LeadershipLarge Nuclear Power Plants (LNPP):
These are reactors with an electric capacity of 1,200-1,600 megawatts of power per reactor, which contribute to support the base load in the grid throughout the year.

2. LeadershipSmall Module Reactors (SMR):
These reactors enable the Kingdom to own and develop atomic energy technologies and build them in isolated places from the electrical grid which suits its water desalination requirements and various thermal applications in the petrochemical industries. Small Module Reactors consist of HTGR reactors and SMART technology reactors.

3. LeadershipNuclear Fuel Cycle (NFC):
It represents the first step of the Kingdom in the path of self-sufficiency in the production of nuclear fuel, which will contribute to the rehabilitation of the national workforce competent in the process of exploration and production of uranium and the use of experience gained in this project to develop the Kingdom's natural resources of uranium.

4. Nuclear & Radiological Regulatory Commission (NRRC):
The Regulator is an independent body that monitors and supervises the implementation of all components of the “Saudi National Atomic Energy Project” in Saudi Arabia to ensure the highest levels of safety aimed at protecting individuals, society, environment and nuclear installations from ionizing radiation and radiation activities in the Kingdom.

K.A.CARE’s Renewable Energy Initiatives 
K.A.CARE has three initiatives linked to the “National Industrial Development and Logistics Program”, which is one of the programs to realize the kingdom's Vision 2030.

(1) National Data Centers for Renewable Energy Initiative:  

The National Data Center for Renewable Energy provides data for studies, research and projects. The Center serves a wide range of users whether investors, researchers, technology developers and others. In order to enable them to obtain data of high accuracy and quality to perform their various tasks. The Center also provides simulation, modeling and forecasting tools for renewable energy. It also provides a comprehensive picture of the state of the renewable energy sector in the Kingdom and its growth rates using advanced means of data intelligence.

(2) Renewable Energy Technologies Localization Initiative:  

The Renewable Energy Technologies Localization Program aims at increasing the local content of the renewable energy technologies sector by accelerating the growth of the local private sector and supporting local companies to develop products, applications and services in the field of renewable energy. The empowerment of the local private sector is through the establishment of joint ventures projects led by the private sector and in accordance to international best practices, as well as the standard studies carried out by K.A.CARE through applying the principle of cost sharing between the government and the local private sector.

(3) Human Capacity Building Initiative:

K.A.CARE works in cooperation with various Stakeholders within the Kingdom and with leading international institutions to develop and stimulate human capital in line with the labor market by supporting, empowering and supervising the development of the environmental education system.

The main objectives of the capacity building initiative are:

 Attracting manpower and employment
 Supporting the development of the environmental education system
 Support the localization of technology and the transfer of knowledge through the construction of human workforce.

Mishkat Interactive Center 
One of K.A.CARE's community initiatives to introduce information about atomic and renewable energy. Mishkat Interactive Centre welcomes visitors from families and male and female students throughout the academic year.

See also.

 Energy in Saudi Arabia
 Nuclear energy in Saudi Arabia
 Nuclear program of Saudi Arabia

References

 K.A.CARE website 
 Vision 2030

External links
King Abdullah City for Atomic and Renewable Energy official website 
The Kingdom's Sustainable Energy Portal for Developers & Investors 

2010 establishments in Saudi Arabia
Government agencies established in 2010
Economy of Saudi Arabia
Energy in Saudi Arabia
Nuclear technology in Saudi Arabia
Government of Saudi Arabia
Renewable energy organizations